Farhad Zavoshi (born 8 February 2003) is an Iranian footballer who plays as a midfielder for Iranian club Havadar in the Persian Gulf Pro League.

Early life

He is from Piranshahr, Iran.

Club career

Early career
Zavoshi started his career as a youth player at KIA and then transferred to Esteghlal, where he played under youth coach Arash Borhani, a former Iran international.

Havadar
He joined Havadar in September 2021 with two-years contract. He made his debut on 24 December 2022 in the 13th match of the 2022–23 Persian Gulf Pro League season against Nassaji Mazandaran.

Club career statistics
Last Update  1 February 2023

International career

Under–20
In July 2022, He was invited to the Iran national under-20 football team by Samad Marfavi. In late 2022 and 2023, he was called up again to represent Iran youth national team.

References

External links

2003 births
Living people
Iranian footballers
Association football goalkeepers
Esteghlal F.C. players
Havadar S.C. players
Persian Gulf Pro League players